William Anderson Orlamond (1 August 1867 – 23 April 1957) was a Danish-American film actor. Orlamond appeared in more than 80 films between 1912 and 1938.

Partial filmography

 A Rogue's Romance (1919)
 Elmo the Mighty (1919)
 Stronger Than Death (1920)
 Vanishing Trails (1920)
 Madame Peacock (1920)
 Camille (1921)
 Doubling for Romeo (1921)
 Beating the Game (1921)
 The Sin Flood (1922)
 All the Brothers Were Valiant (1923)
 Souls for Sale (1923)
 Slander the Woman (1923)
 The Eternal Three (1923)
 Slave of Desire (1923)
 The Eagle's Feather (1923)
 Look Your Best (1923)
 The Narrow Street (1924)
 Name the Man (1924)
 Nellie, the Beautiful Cloak Model (1924)
 The White Moth (1924)
 When a Girl Loves (1924)
 The Wife of the Centaur (1924)
 The Dixie Handicap (1924)
 Boys Will Be Joys (1925)
 Seven Keys to Baldpate (1925)
 Good Cheer (1926)
 That's My Baby (1926)
 Baby Clothes (1926)
 Up in Mabel's Room (1926)
 Mantrap (1926)
 Bromo and Juliet (1926)
 Kid Boots (1926)
 A Texas Steer (1927)
 See You in Jail (1927)
 Getting Gertie's Garter (1927)
 The Taxi Dancer (1927)
 The Red Mill (1927)
 Rose-Marie (1928)
 While the City Sleeps (1928)
 The Wind (1928)
 The Awakening (1928)
 The Girl from Woolworth's (1929)
 Words and Music (1929)
 House of Horror (1929)
 The Way of All Men (1930)
 Are These Our Children? (1931)

External links

1867 births
1957 deaths
American male film actors
American male silent film actors
Danish emigrants to the United States
Male actors from Copenhagen
20th-century American male actors